Roger Chaunce (fl. 1414-1429), was an English Member of Parliament.

References

14th-century births
15th-century deaths
14th-century English people
People from Reigate
Members of the Parliament of England (pre-1707)